Clear-cell tumor (any with clear cells) can refer to:
 clear-cell sarcoma, including
 clear-cell sarcoma of the kidney
 clear-cell carcinoma, mostly
 clear-cell adenocarcinoma